Nikola Mektić and Antonio Veić were the defending champions but decided not to participate.
Wildcards Martín Cuevas and Pablo Cuevas, won the title despite winning only 1 match in the quarterfinals after a series of withdrawals.

Seeds

Draw

Draw

References
 Main Draw

Uruguay Open - Doubles
2013 Doubles
2013 in Uruguayan tennis